Washington Square Historic District may refer to:

Washington Square Historic District (Chicago), in Chicago, Illinois, US, listed on the National Register of Historic Places
Washington Square Historic District (Oswego, New York), listed on the National Register of Historic Places listings in Oswego County, New York
Washington Square West Historic District, in Philadelphia, Pennsylvania, US, listed on the National Register of Historic Places
Washington Square Historic District (Nacogdoches, Texas), in Nacogdoches County, Texas, US, listed on the National Register of Historic Places